Events from the year 1969 in art.

Events
 January 9 – In Washington, D.C., the Smithsonian Institution displays the art of Winslow Homer for 6 weeks.
 February 2 – Ten paintings are defaced in New York's Metropolitan Museum of Art.
 August 8 – Iain Macmillan photographs the cover picture for The Beatles' album Abbey Road in London.
 October 5 – Monty Python's Flying Circus is broadcast for the first time on BBC Television, with Terry Gilliam's animations.
 October 18 – Caravaggio's Nativity with St. Francis and St. Lawrence (c.1609) is stolen from its frame in the Oratory of Saint Lawrence in Palermo, Sicily; it has not been recovered as of 2020.
 November 19 – The Apollo 12 lunar module lands on the moon; American artist Forrest "Frosty" Myers claims to have smuggled the art piece Moon Museum onto a leg of the module which will remain on the surface.
 c. December – The music and performance art collective COUM Transmissions is formed in England by Genesis P-Orridge.
 Late – Andy Warhol, John Wilcock, and Gerard Malanga co-found the magazine Interview.
 Opening of the Oakland Museum of California, designed by Kevin Roche.
 Lyrical Abstraction exhibition debuts at the Aldrich Contemporary Art Museum marking a significant return to expressivity in American abstract painting. For two years the exhibition travels throughout the U.S. including to the Whitney Museum of American Art in New York City.

Awards
 Archibald Prize: Ray Crooke – George Johnston
 John Moores Painting Prize - Richard Hamilton and Mary Martin for "Toaster" and "Cross" (respectively)

Works

 Kenojuak Ashevak – The Owl
 Michael Ayrton – The Arkville Minotaur
 Francis Bacon – Three Studies of Lucian Freud
 Thomas Bass – Australian Seal (bronze, Washington, D.C.)
 Edward Bawden – Victoria tile motif on London Underground's Victoria line
 Fernando Botero - Protestant Family
 Alexander Calder – La Grande Vitesse (sculpture)
 Christo and Jeanne Claude - "Wrapped Coast" in Little Bay, Sydney, New South Wales, Australia
 Mai Dantsig – Partisan Ballad
 Helen Frankenthaler – Slice of Stone Itself
 Frank Frazetta – Egyptian Queen
 Milton Glaser - Speed City
 Anna Hyatt Huntington - Equestrian statue of Israel Putnam at Putnam Memorial State Park in Redding, Connecticut (dedicated)
 Allen Jones – Hatstand, Table and Chair (sculptures)
 Ronnie Landfield – Diamond Lake
 André Lufwa - "Batteur de tam-tam"
 Joan Mitchell - Sans Neige
 Kanda Nissho – Snow Farm
  Pablo Picasso-  The Kiss
 Enzo Plazzotta – Baigneuse
 Jean-Paul Riopelle – La Joute (public sculptural installation, Montreal)
 Will Roberts – Redberth Village, Pembrokeshire
 Alexander Semionov – Leningrad in the Morning
 Victor Teterin – Sredne-Podjacheskaya Street in Leningrad
 Nikolai Timkov – Russian Winter
 Hans Unger – Oxford Circus and Green Park tile motifs on London Underground's Victoria line

Births
 January 5 – Marilyn Manson, American rock musician and painter
 February 7 – Andrew Micallef, Maltese painter and musician
 July 11 – Abigail McLellan, British painter (d. 2009)
 October 5 – Chantal Joffe, English painter
 November 26 – Kara Walker, African American artist
 date unknown
 Boushra Almutawakel, Yemeni photographer
 Steven Claydon, English sculptor, installation artist and musician
 Invader, French urban artist
 Patricia Martín, Mexican curator

Deaths
 January 29 – Edward Marshall Boehm, American Expressionist sculptor (b. 1913)
 March 14 – Ben Shahn, Lithuanian-born American painter and photographer (b. 1898)
 March 17 – Daniel Vázquez Díaz, Spanish painter (b. 1882)
 May 11 – T. K. Padmini, Keralan feminist painter (b. 1940; d. in childbirth)
 July 5 – Walter Gropius, German-born architect (b. 1883)
 July 9 – Emerik Feješ, Hungarian and Serbian painter (b. 1904)
 July 25 – Otto Dix, German painter and printmaker (b. 1891)
 August – Doris Brabham Hatt, English modernist painter (b. 1890)
 September 15 – Edith Barry, American sculptor, painter, illustrator and designer (b. 1883) 
 November 21 – Norman Lindsay, Australian sculptor and cartoonist (born 1879)

See also
 1969 in fine arts of the Soviet Union

References

 
Years of the 20th century in art
1960s in art